Pawnee Township may refer to:

 Pawnee Township, Sangamon County, Illinois
 Pawnee Township, Bourbon County, Kansas
 Pawnee Township, Pawnee County, Kansas, in Pawnee County, Kansas
 Pawnee Township, Smith County, Kansas, in Smith County, Kansas
 Pawnee Township, Platte County, Missouri

	
Township name disambiguation pages